Adam Lowe may refer to:

Adam Lowe (writer), British writer
J. Adam Lowe, American politician